This is a list of electricity-generating power stations in the U.S. state of Kansas, sorted by type and name. In 2020, Kansas had a total summer capacity of 16,981 MW through all of its power plants, and a net generation of 54,542 GWh. The corresponding electrical energy generation mix was 41.5% wind, 34% coal, 18.2% nuclear, 5.9% natural gas, 0.2% petroleum, 0.1% biomass, and 0.1% hydroelectric. Distributed small-scale solar, including customer-owned photovoltaic panels, delivered an additional net 48 GWh to the state's electricity grid. This compares as slightly less than the 58 GWh (0.1% share) generated by Kansas's utility-scale solar facilities.

Nuclear power stations

Fossil-fuel power stations 
Data reported by U.S. Energy Information Administration

Coal

Natural gas

Petroleum

 Multi-fuel plant, listed is "Total Net Summer Capacity" by source.

Renewable power stations
Data reported by U.S. Energy Information Administration

Biomass

Geothermal
There were no utility-scale geothermal power facilities in the state of Kansas in 2019.

Hydroelectric

Solar

Wind

Storage power stations
Data reported by U.S. Energy Information Administration

Battery storage
There were no utility-scale battery storage facilities in the state of Kansas in 2019.

Pumped storage
There were no utility-scale pumped storage facilities in the state of Kansas in 2019.

See also 
 List of power stations in the United States
 List of wind farms in the United States

References

Kansas
 
Lists of buildings and structures in Kansas
Energy in Kansas